Nesim Tahirović (23 October 1941 – 14 August 2020) was a Bosnian painter. He studied art (painting) in Belgrade under professor Kosta Hakman.

Along with painting he also worked in the area of scenic design and other applied arts. During a forty five-year career as an independent artist he had around sixty solo exhibitions and more than hundred group exhibitions in his native country and abroad where he also received numerous awards for both painting and scenic design. His paintings were exhibited in museums, galleries and sold to private collectors all over the world. He was a member of The Association of Applied Artists and Designers of Bosnia and Herzegovina (ULUPUBiH) and Association of Visual Artists of Bosnia and Herzegovina (ULUBiH). He lived and worked in Tuzla as an independent artist
.

Solo exhibitions
1963 – Tuzla
1964 – Tuzla
1966 – Osijek
1967 – Osijek
1975 – Osijek, Sarajevo
1976 – Portorož
1977 – Trieste
1978 – Lignano
1979 – Graz, Trieste, Graz
1981 – Tuzla, Tuzla
1983 – Tuzla
1987 – Novi Sad
1988 – Belgrade, Tuzla
1989 – Warszawa, Płock, Sierpc, Olsztyn
1990 – Toruń, Frombork, Ratingen
1991 – Ratingen, Ratingen, Bolesławiec, Zgorzelec
1992 – Braniewo, Płock, Ratingen, München, Ratzeburg, Ratingen, Grevenbroich
1993 – Coesfeld, Hilden, Müllheim an der Ruhr, Velbert, Ronchi dei Legionari
1994 – Sarajevo, Duisburg, Wetzlar, Essen, Ratingen, Leverkusen
1995 – Biberach, Göttingen, Zenica, Leipzig
1996 – Tuzla, Bosnia and Herzegovina
1999 – Osijek, Zagreb
2000 – Issum
2001 – Bihać
2002 – Novi Sad
2003 – Subotica
2005 – Brčko
2007 – Jajce
2010 – Sarajevo

External links
www.nesimtahirovic.com
ULUPUBiH
ULUBiH

References

1941 births
2020 deaths
Artists from Tuzla
Bosniaks of Bosnia and Herzegovina
Bosnia and Herzegovina painters
Bosnia and Herzegovina sculptors
20th-century Bosnia and Herzegovina painters
20th-century sculptors
21st-century Bosnia and Herzegovina painters
21st-century sculptors
20th-century Bosnia and Herzegovina artists
21st-century Bosnia and Herzegovina artists